Grover Cleveland Brewer (1884–1956) was among the most famous 20th-century leaders in the Churches of Christ. He was said to be "among the giants of the brotherhood" (Woods 246). "G. C." Brewer was named for U.S. President Grover Cleveland. Brewer is generally known by his initials. He was born in Giles County, Tennessee; he died in Searcy, Arkansas, on June 9, 1956. He was an author, preacher, and teacher, serving on the faculty of Lipscomb University (then known as David Lipscomb College). His persuasive rhetoric and passionate oratory have been noted, along with his uncanny ability to define mainstream biblical doctrine in the mid-20th century. (His brother, Dr. Charles R. Brewer, was also a notable preacher and a teacher at David Lipscomb University, where to this day a bell tower stands in his honor.) G. C. Brewer was no stranger to controversy, challenging Catholicism and Communism directly and debating frequently; yet he also demonstrated a willingness to change his views, especially those regarding the doctrine of grace.

Grace 

According to Leonard Allen (163-64), John Mark Hicks , and Richard Hughes (186-87), Brewer's championing of K. C. Moser's book The Way of Salvation (1932) signaled a paradigm shift in the way that people in the Churches of Christ were thinking about grace. Brewer wrote that "Our salvation does not depend upon our perfect adherence to the requirements of law. . . . By making our salvation dependent upon our own perfection, we make void the grace of God" (qtd. in Allen 164). Especially in the 1930s, Foy E. Wallace and Brewer engaged in a longstanding feud over this and other controversial issues, "contending for the faith" at the Abilene Christian College Bible Lectures and in the pages of the Gospel Advocate and other periodicals. Wallace took Moser's book for "denominational error on the gospel plan of salvation" (qtd. in Hicks) whereas Brewer sought to de-emphasize legalism and human works and to promote a theory of God-given "unmerited favor" (Hughes 186).

Non-Institutional Churches 

One facet of their disagreement (albeit more financial than theological) eventually led to a schism, whereby Wallace and Brewer debated the propriety of churches funding colleges. Non-institutional Churches of Christ remember Brewer mainly for his unwavering call for congregational support of colleges associated with the Churches of Christ, a position that non-institutional churches reject. See The churches of Christ (non-institutional) for more about the debate over this issue. Historian Richard Hughes has characterized Wallace's "fighting style" (176-77, 182-85) in a way that could well describe Brewer's rhetorical aggression.

Politics and Pacifism 

Despite Brewer's clearly stated patriotism, he was also a product of the teachings of James A. Harding and David Lipscomb. At their Nashville Bible School (Lipscomb University), where Brewer enrolled in 1904 after a year at Johnson Bible College, Brewer learned to downplay politics, a lesson he held dear his entire life. Hughes has noted "that shortly before his [Brewer's] death in 1956 he recalled, 'I have never even voted in my life'" (186). Lipscomb had been a lifelong pacifist, even during the Civil War, yet Brewer believed that the threat of Communism was simply too great to ignore. Brewer therefore balanced his disengagement from the ways of the world with his active concerns for the Christian identity of American politics. This balance characterized many of the Churches of Christ in the mid-20th century.

Brewer was also a vociferous anti-feminist, attributing much of America's 20th-century moral decline to the emancipation of women. (Chapter 3 of his autobiography is dedicated to the topic.) He opined that women in positions of authority must 'constantly battle against the tendency to become masculine, coarse, and brazen.' He blamed liberated fallen women for irresistibly tempting good Christian boys into sexual sin. He also believed that women were the spiritual inferiors of men. Sinful men can be reformed, but, 'When woman goes wrong... there is little hope of ever reaching her...she can never be worth anything in his world...it were better for her to go immediately to the electric chair.'

Brewer was also a conspiracy theorist, claiming that 'The United States passed completely under the control of Roman Catholics, Jews and Communists under the reign  of Franklin D. Roosevelt.' Weakly defending against his suspicions that he might be a bigot, Brewer wrote, 'Not all Jews are un-American, not all Catholics are disloyal to our ideals, but all Communists are un-American and anti-American.  The Jews are internationalists, the Catholics are subject to a foreign power, and the Catholic system is contrary to American ideals.' 
(Autobiography, p. 26 )

Books by G. C. Brewer 

 The Model Church. Nashville, TN: McQuiddy Printing Co, 1919.  See  for online text.  Also reprinted by the Gospel Advocate, .
 Christ Crucified: A Book of Sermons Together with a Lecture on Evolution. Nashville, TN: Gospel Advocate, 1959. (rpt. of 1928 ed.)
 Contending For the Faith.  Nashville:  Gospel Advocate, 1941.
 As Touching Those Who Were Once Enlightened.  Nashville:  Gospel Advocate, 1946.
 Forty Years on the Firing Line.  Old Paths Book Club, 1948.
 Foundation Facts and Primary Principles: Being the Restoration Story Related and Re-Examined in a Manner Suited for a Textbook. Kansas City, Mo.: Old Paths Book Club, 1949.
 A Story of Toil and Tears of Love and Laughter: Being the Autobiography of G. C. Brewer. Murfreesboro, TN: DeHoff Publications, 1957.  (Sometimes this is cited simply as "Autobiography of G. C. Brewer.")

Articles and miscellaneous publications 

“Can Churches Scripturally Contribute to Christian Colleges?” Harding University Lectures. Vol. 24. 1947. pg. 109.

"Christ Today: Our Mediator and High Priest." (speech given in February 1938 and reprinted on pages 199-209 of the volume Abilene Christian College Lectures printed by Abilene Christian College Bookstore later in 1938)

“Communism and Its Four Horsemen.” Voice of Freedom. Vol. 22, pg. 10. (See also “Communism and Its Four Horsemen: Atheism, Immorality, Class Hatred, Pacifism." Nashville: Gospel Advocate. n.d.)

“Grace and Law: Legalism and Liberalism” (a series of articles that originally ran in the Gospel Advocate in 1955.) Firm Foundation reprinted some of these articles in 1992-93.

"Read this Book," Gospel Advocate 75 (11 May 1933): 434. (Brewer's book review of K. C. Moser's The Way of Salvation .)

“Relationship of Christian Education to the Church.” Harding University Lectures. Vol. 24. 1947. pg. 95.

External links 

 Brewer at The Restoration Movement website www.therestorationmovement.com
 Brewer's The Model Church online 
 Warren Saunders Jones's dissertation, G. C. Brewer: Lecturer, Debater and Preacher. (Wayne State UP, 1960) 
 John Mark Hicks on Brewer's theory of grace  (accessed 13 April 2007)
 John Mark Hicks's intro to K. C. Moser situates Brewer as spokesperson for the strong grace position 
 Autobiography of G. C. Brewer.
 "Rise of the Political Pulpit" Michael W. Casey in Leaven, Vol. 6 [1998], Iss. 3, Art. 13 (Pepperrdine University)

Bibliography 

 Allen, Leonard C. Distant Voices: Discovering a Forgotten Past for a Changing Church. Abilene, TX: ACU Press, 1993. (See especially pages 162-69.)
 Hughes, Richard T. Reviving the Ancient Faith: The Story of Churches of Christ in America. Cambridge, UK: Eerdmans, 1996.
 Lambert, Gussie. In Memoriam. Shreveport, LA: 1988. pages 34, 35.
 Woods, Guy N. "Brother Goodpasture As I Knew Him." Gospel Advocate Vol. CXIX, No. 16, April 21, 1977. page 246. (Source of the "giants of the brotherhood" phrase cited in the opening lines of this article, Woods's comments are reprinted here .)

Notes

1884 births
1956 deaths
American members of the Churches of Christ
Johnson University alumni
Lipscomb University alumni
Lipscomb University faculty
Ministers of the Churches of Christ
Restoration Movement